Mwingi is a town in the Kitui County in the Eastern Region of the Republic of Kenya. It has an urban population of 15,970 (2009 census). It was the capital of the former Mwingi District.

Mwingi is home to Kenya's Vice President (2007–2013) Stephen Kalonzo Musyoka. Major schools include St. Joseph's Junior Seminary, Mwingi Boys, Migwani Boys, Kimangao Girls, Thitani Girls, Kyuso Boys and Kyome Boys spread across the entire mwingi region that includes the subcounties of Central, Mwingi East, Migwani, Kyuso, Mumoni, and Tseikuru,

Gallery

References

Populated places in Kitui County